Kreider Shoe Manufacturing Company is a historic factory building located at Elizabethtown, Lancaster County, Pennsylvania. It was built in 1905, and is a three- to four-story, "U"-shaped, brick building.  It is 21 bays wide and 13 bays deep and sits on a rough limestone foundation. It housed the A.S. Kreider Shoe  Manufacturing Company until 1954, after which it was used as a garment factory.

It was listed on the National Register of Historic Places in 1980. The building was remodeled, and is now used for apartment dwellings.

References

Industrial buildings and structures on the National Register of Historic Places in Pennsylvania
Industrial buildings completed in 1905
Buildings and structures in Lancaster County, Pennsylvania
National Register of Historic Places in Lancaster County, Pennsylvania
1905 establishments in Pennsylvania